S. leucoptera  may refer to:
 Sporophila leucoptera, the white-bellied seedeater, a bird species found in Argentina, Bolivia, Brazil, Paraguay, Peru and Suriname
 Stoloteuthis leucoptera, the butterfly bobtail squid, a widespread squid species found in the Atlantic Ocean, Mediterranean Sea and southwestern Indian Ocean

See also
 Leucoptera (disambiguation)